is the fourth studio album by German rock band Stahlmann, released in 2015.

The album reached number 22 on the Official German Charts in September 2015.

Track listing

References 

2015 albums
AFM Records albums
Stahlmann albums